Apio is a surname. Notable people with the surname include:
Caroline Asiimwe, Ugandan veterinary and environment conservation leader and researcher
Florence Akiiki Asiimwe (born 1980), Ugandan politician, author, and lecturer
Jacqueline Asiimwe (born 1970), Ugandan human rights lawyer and philanthropy advisor
Molly Musiime Asiimwe, Ugandan politician and woman member of parliament

Surnames of Ugandan origin